The Hawai`i Maritime Center was the principal maritime museum in the State of Hawai`i from 1988 until it closed in 2009. Located at Pier 7 of Honolulu Harbor east of Aloha Tower, the center was a campus of the Princess Bernice Pauahi Bishop Museum. The Hawai`i Maritime Center was built on what once was the private boathouse of King David Kalakaua and was home to the only four-masted, full-rigged ship in the world called the Falls of Clyde.  The Falls of Clyde was built in 1878 for the oil industry and is a National Historic Landmark. Also docked at the Hawai`i Maritime Center was the voyaging canoe Hokule`a, a scientific research vessel of great importance to native Hawaiian culture.

Due to prevailing economic conditions, the Hawai'i Maritime Center was closed to the public effective May 1, 2009. In December 2017, the Bishop Museum transferred its lease between the Maritime Center and the State of Hawaii to a third party, and ceased operating the Center. Plans for its future are unknown.

See also
List of maritime museums in the United States

References

External links
 Hawai`i Maritime Center
 Princess Bernice Pauahi Bishop Museum

Maritime museums in Hawaii
Museums in Honolulu
Hōkūleʻa
Defunct museums in Hawaii
1988 establishments in Hawaii
2009 disestablishments in Hawaii